Milka Yelisava Chulina Urbanich (born January 6, 1974) is a Venezuelan actress, model and Miss Venezuela 1992 winner, second runner-up at Miss Universe 1993 and Top 15 semifinalist at Miss International 1994.

Miss Venezuela
Born to Croatian parents, Chulina grew up in Maracay, Venezuela, and competed in 1992 as Miss Aragua in her country's national beauty pageant, Miss Venezuela, capturing the crown and the right to represent her country in Miss Universe 1993.

Miss Universe
As the official representative of her country to the 1993 Miss Universe pageant held in Mexico City, Mexico on May 21, 1993, she got the highest semifinal interview score in the history of the pageant at the time, a combined score of 9.843. In the end, she placed second runner-up to Miss Universe 1993.

Miss International
After Miss Universe, Chulina represented her country in the 1994 Miss International pageant held in Ise, Japan, on September 4, 1994, where she was one of the Top 15 semifinalists.

Television career
From 1992 to 1996, Chulina co-hosted the variety show Súper Sábado Sensacional alongside Gilberto Correa on Venevision.

References

External links
Miss Venezuela Official Website
Miss Universe Official Website

1974 births
Living people
Miss International 1994 delegates
Miss Universe 1993 contestants
Miss Venezuela winners
Miss Venezuela International winners
People from Ciudad Bolívar
People from Maracay
Venezuelan people of Croatian descent